Salem K. Meera is a Carnatic musician in Salem. She is well-versed in vocal, veena and keyboard. Meera has composed many swarajathis, varnams, thilanas and Tamil songs. She has been running a music school named after her parents, Sri Gowri Kanakasabapathy Gana Vidya Nilayam, at her residence since 2 February 1977 and has continually trained thousands of students in Carnatic vocals, veena and keyboard. The school encourages a lot of group study with a good guru–student relationship.
She has been the joint president of Salem Sangeetha Vidwath sabha for the past three years. She also served as the president of the sabha for six years and secretary for six years, as well as committee member and vice president for 12 years. She is an active and creative participant in the sabha activities. She has been performing in the Salem sabha from 1950 until now (2011).

Personal life 
Meera was born on 18 October 1946 to Sri. S. Kanakasabapathy Mudaliar and Mrs. Gowri Kanakasabapathy. Her mother is a great Sangeetha vidushi, Devi Upasagi and a disciple of Arumuga Mudaliar, who is a student of Tiger Varadachariar.  She is also the niece of Kalaimamani. Salem S. Jayalakshmi.

Gurus 
Meera started her music career under the guidance of her mother. Later she was trained by her gurus, Narasimha Bagavadar, who was also a music director for modern theaters at Salem, and then Sri. Eachankudi N.Ramamoorthi. Later on she continued with Mysore Asthana Vidwan Sri.M.Manavala Naidu who received the title Swara Sahithya Kartha in seven languages from Sri. Harikesanallur Muthiah Bagavadar. Sri.M.Manavala Naidu's guru was Sri. Belakuvadi Srinivasa Iyengar.

Early age 
A well performer of Isai Sorpozhivu from her fourth year, she started her career in front of the Archbishop of Rome. At a young age and without any stage fright, she performed various concerts. She also took part in many intra- and inter-school competitions and won gold medals in music.

Titles 
In her 25th year she received many titles like Gana Kalavani honoured and given by Silasri. GnanaPrakasa Swamigal of Kanchi Thondai Mandala mutt. She was also blessed and honored by Kanchi Maha Periyavar on 1 April 1970 at Kolla Chatram Kanchi.

Performances and honors 

 On 10 February 1972 she was honored by the great Sangeetha Kalanidhi Sri K.Mudikondan Venkatrama Iyer for rendering "108 Chakra Thala Pallavis".
 She gave an excellent demonstration on a pallavi on "Tribinna thalam" in the raga Kalyani during the All India Musicians Conference at Kutchalambal Chautru at Bangalore.
 She gave many concerts at Music Academy, Tamil Isai Sangham and Bharadhya Vidya Bhavan. These concerts were presided over by musicians such as Sangeetha Kalanidhi Sri. Chembai Vaidyanada Bagavadar, Kavi Sri.Subramanya Iyer, Mudikonda Venkatrama Iyer, and Manakkal Rangarajan.
 She was honored and praised by Minerva Principal and music critic Sri.Prasuram Iyer.
 She gave a performance for about 4 1/2 hours at Thiruvarur Thepa Uthsavam and many main programs at Mysore Dasara festival.
 She performed at Bidaram Rama Mandiram sabha concert at Bangalore, accompanied by Sri. Seshagiri Rao on violin and Sri. Nagapushana Achariar on the mridangham. Seshagiri Rao's guru was Sri. T. Chowdaiya.
 She self-tuned and sang the Tamil Navagraha Krithi at All India Jothidar Mahanadu under the presence of Murugu Rajendaran at Salem Theosophical society. At this occasion she received the title Laya Gnana Isai Perarasi and was appreciated and blessed by Sri. Trichy Thayumanavan.
 She was honored for her music service rendered to the Salemites by the Salem Rotary Club.
 She was honored as a veteran musician by the junior chamber of Salem Sangeetha sabha on World Women's Day in 2006.
 She was honored by Sri Mathaji of Rajarajeshwari Mahila Samajam of Salem for singing her compositions, the Padhinetu Padigal, Geetha's thapanyam in 18 venpas, and in 18 ragas as ragamalika.
 She also performed for Telugu Samajam, Sri Mayama centre at Salem and Mouna guru swamigal adhistanam at Dhindukal.

Accompanies 
She was accompanied by well-known musicians for her vocal, veena and keyboard concerts. She was accompanied by musicians like Coimbatore CN.Ramaswamy, Thiru M.N.Kandaswamy, Sri Manarkudi Eswaran, Sri Madurai Chellapa, Bangalore Veerabadraya, Sri Gadam Manjunathan, Sri Bangalore T.A.S Mani, Chikkal Bhaskaran, T.R Kesavalu, Papanasam Smt.Balasaraswathy, Delhi Lalitha, Bangalore Seshagiri Rao, Kandadhevi Alagiriswamy, Coimbatore B.Dakshinamoorthy and many more.

Culture and tradition 
She brings up Hindu culture and tradition and she celebrates every festival accordingly. She not only teaches music to her disciples but also the Hindu tradition and culture.

Salem Sangeetha Vidwath Sabha 
Salem sabha has been conducting quality Carnatic music concerts with many popular artists performing every year in the month of May at Salem, Tamil Nadu, India.

References 
 http://www.salemsabha.org/salemarists
 
 http://mycarnatic.org/popup/?id=6&type=main
 

1946 births
Living people
Carnatic composers
People from Salem district
Musicians from Tamil Nadu